Diane Chamberlain is an American author of adult fiction. Chamberlain is in the New York Times, USA Today and Sunday Times  lists of bestselling authors, having published 30 novels in more than twenty languages.

Novels
1989 – Private Relations
1990 – Lovers and Strangers 
1991 – Secret Lives
1992 – Keeper of the Light
1993 – Fire and Rain
1995 – Brass Ring
1996 – Reflection
1997 – The Escape Artist
1999 – Breaking the Silence (aka Remembering Me)
1999 – Summer’s Child
2001 – The Courage Tree
2002 – Cypress Point (aka The Shadow Wife) (aka The Forgotten Son)
2003 – Kiss River
2004 – Her Mother’s Shadow
2005 – The Bay at Midnight
2005 – "The Dreamer" (short story in anthology The Journey Home)
2006 – The Secret Life of CeeCee Wilkes (aka A Beautiful Lie) (aka The Lost Daughter)
2008 - Before the Storm
2009 - Secrets She Left Behind
2010 - The Lies We Told
2011 - The Midwife's Confession
2012 - The Good Father
2013 - "The First Lie" (e-short story)
2013 - Necessary Lies
2013 - "The Broken String" (e-short story)
2014 - The Silent Sister
2015 - "The Dance Begins" (e-short story)
2015 - Pretending to Dance  
2017 - The Stolen Marriage
2018 - The Dream Daughter
2020 - Big Lies in a Small Town
2021 - The Last House on the Street

References

External links
 Official site

Living people
Year of birth missing (living people)
Writers from Plainfield, New Jersey
San Diego State University alumni
RITA Award winners